Angel of Death is a web series created by Ed Brubaker. The series stars Zoë Bell as Eve, an assassin taking revenge on her former employers. The series also features Lucy Lawless. It is produced by White Rock Lake Production and distributed by Sony Pictures Television.

The episodes were released on Crackle from March 2 to March 13, 2009.

Plot
The show is a thriller about the assassin, Eve, who is employed by a ruthless crime family. After suffering a severe head trauma (knife through her head) while on the job, she begins to hallucinate and becomes haunted by her victims. As a result of her injury, Eve is driven to seek revenge on those who ordered the hits in the first place—her mob employers.

History
While developing the story about a cold-blooded killer growing a conscience, Brubaker's original idea for the series was a hitman afflicted with brain cancer, but then remembered watching a scene in an old PBS documentary series where a patient walked into the ER with a hunting knife stabbed right through his skull, and drew inspiration from that for Eve's head injury.  Angel of Death is Brubaker's first online series.

The show reunites Lucy Lawless, Ted Raimi, and Zoë Bell - who all worked together on Xena: Warrior Princess. Bell was Lawless's stunt-double on the long-running series.

Other formats
Once the show finished its original online broadcast, it was released on DVD, with new footage. The DVD was going to be released in June 2009, but instead ended up being released on July 28, 2009.

A feature-length compilation of the web series was available for viewing on Hulu until 2017.

Cast
Zoë Bell: Eve, the assassin.
Lucy Lawless: Vera, Eve's next-door neighbor.
Doug Jones: Dr. Rankin, who helps Eve after her head trauma.
Vail Bloom: Regina Downes
Ted Raimi: Jed Norton
Brian Poth: Graham Prescott
Justin Huen: Franklin
Jake Abel: Cameron Downes
Monica Staggs: The Madame

Episodes

References

External links
 Angel of Death at the Internet Movie Database
 Ed Brubaker at the Internet Movie Database
 Zoe Bell at the Internet Movie Database
 Lucy Lawless at the Internet Movie Database
 Paul Etheredge at the Internet Movie Database
 Ted Raimi at the Internet Movie Database

2009 web series debuts
2009 web series endings
Crackle (streaming service) original programming
Crime web series
American drama web series
Works by Ed Brubaker
Action web series